Lick Creek is a stream in the U.S. state of Tennessee.

Lick Creek was named for mineral licks along its course which attracted deer.

References

Rivers of Henderson County, Tennessee
Rivers of Tennessee